Mohammed Al-Mosawi (born 12 May 1995) is a Kuwaiti karateka. He represented Kuwait at the 2020 Summer Olympics in Tokyo, Japan. He competed in the men's kata event. He finished in 5th place in his pool in the elimination round and he did not advance to the next round.

Career 

He Won several medals in Asian Championships, Islamic Solidarity Games , Gulf Championship and Arab Championship and Bronze medal in the World Championship in Team Kata Event.

He also won several medals, including gold, Silver and bronze medals in the WKF Karate1 Premier League and Series A Championship.

He won one of the bronze medals in his event at the 2021 Asian Karate Championships held in Almaty, Kazakhstan.

Achievements 

He competed at the World Olympic Qualification Tournament held in Paris, France. He did not qualify at this tournament but he qualified after the allocation of Tripartite Commission Invitation places and the reassignment of the last qualifying spots.

Now he will represent Kuwait Team at the Karate competition of the Olympic Games Tokyo 2020.

References 

Living people
1995 births
Kuwaiti people of Iranian descent
Place of birth missing (living people)
Kuwaiti male karateka
Karateka at the 2020 Summer Olympics
Islamic Solidarity Games medalists in karate
Islamic Solidarity Games competitors for Kuwait
21st-century Kuwaiti people